Martin Johan Lidberg (born 1 February 1973) is a Swedish former professional wrestler. He is a world champion, two-time European champion as well as 19-time Swedish champion. He has competed in the olympics three times (last time in Athens). In 2007 he won Let's Dance 2007 in Sweden together with his dancing partner Cecilia Ehrling, defeating Tobbe Blom, host of Idol 2005. Lidberg and Ehrling represented Sweden in the Eurovision Dance Contest 2007, where they placed 14th.

Lidberg defeated MMA fighter Dan Henderson at the 1996 Olympics.

In the 2004 Olympic Games in Athens, he failed to qualify for the Wrestling semi-finals when he was beaten by Russian wrestler Gogi Koguashvili. He decided to retire from wrestling after the 2004 Olympics were over.

In 2017, he participated in Mästarnas mästare, and won.

Lidberg participates in Bahador Shahidi's documentary film Jimmy the Wrestler (2021) about his younger brother, fellow wrestler Jimmy Lidberg.

His son, Isac Lidberg, is a professional footballer.

Accomplishments

Greco-Roman Wrestling

2004 Gold medal (96 kg) - European championships
2003 Gold medal (96 kg) - World championships
2000 Gold medal (85 kg) - European championships
2000 Sixth place - the Olympics
1999 Fifth place - World championships
1999 Silver medal - European championships
1998 Bronze medal - European championships
1998 Bronze medal - World championships
1997 Fourth place - World championships
1996 Sixth place - the Olympics

References

External links

Recent Interview
Martin about shattered olympic medal dream from athens
Martin after winning let's dance
Martin's let's dance page, Tv4.se

1973 births
Swedish television personalities
Dancing with the Stars winners
Living people
Olympic wrestlers of Sweden
Wrestlers at the 1996 Summer Olympics
Wrestlers at the 2000 Summer Olympics
Swedish male sport wrestlers
Wrestlers at the 2004 Summer Olympics